Running on Empty is a 1988 American drama film directed by Sidney Lumet and written by Naomi Foner and starring River Phoenix, Judd Hirsch, Christine Lahti, and Martha Plimpton. It was produced by Lorimar Film Entertainment. It is the story of a counterculture couple on the run from the FBI, and how one of their sons starts to break out of this fugitive lifestyle.

Phoenix was nominated for the Academy Award for Best Supporting Actor for his role as Danny Pope in the film; Naomi Foner was nominated for Best Original Screenplay. Phoenix was nominated for Best Performance by an Actor in a Supporting Role in a Motion Picture at the Golden Globes; Lahti was nominated for Best Performance by an Actress in a Motion Picture Drama. The film was nominated for Best Director and Best Motion Picture Drama, and it won a Golden Globe Award for Best Screenplay. Plimpton was nominated for a Young Artist Award for Best Young Actress in a Motion Picture. In a backstage interview on March 21, 1989, at the 61st Academy Awards Nominees Luncheon, Phoenix expressed his wishes for the film to have a sequel.

The film marked the second time that Phoenix and Plimpton played romantic interests, having co-starred in the film The Mosquito Coast two years earlier.

Plot
Parents Annie and Arthur Pope are on the run as they were responsible for the anti-war protest bombing of a napalm laboratory in 1971.  The incident accidentally blinded and paralyzed a janitor who was not supposed to be there.  They have been on the run ever since, relying on an underground network of supporters who help them financially.  At the time of the incident, their son Danny was two years old. As the film begins, he is in his late teens, and the family, now with younger son Harry, are again relocating and assuming new identities.

Danny's overwhelming talent as a pianist catches the attention of his music teacher at school.  The teacher begins to pry into Danny's personal life, particularly questioning why records from his previous school are unobtainable.  While he pushes Danny to audition for Juilliard, Danny also falls in love with Lorna, the teacher's teenage daughter.

As the pressure to have his own life and realize his own dreams intensifies, Danny reveals his family secret to Lorna.  Meanwhile, Annie finds out about Danny's audition and begins to come to terms with the fact that she must let her son go and find his own way.  This does not sit well with Arthur even as Annie risks their safety to contact her estranged father and arrange a home and life for Danny if they should decide to leave him behind.

When Arthur hears on the radio that one of their underground colleagues has been shot and killed running from the authorities, he realizes that it is better for his son to pursue his dreams than to continue living a dangerous life on the run from crimes for which Danny bears no responsibility.  The family leaves Danny behind and heads off for their next identity in a new town.

Cast

 River Phoenix as Danny Pope
 Christine Lahti as Annie Pope
 Judd Hirsch as Arthur Pope
 Jonas Abry as Harry Pope
 Martha Plimpton as Lorna Phillips
 Ed Crowley as Mr. Phillips (Lorna's father)
 Steven Hill as Donald Patterson (Annie's father)
 Augusta Dabney as Abigail Patterson (Annie's mother)
 L. M. Kit Carson as Gus Winant
 David Margulies as Dr. Jonah Reiff
 Lynne Thigpen as Contact at Eldridge St.
 Marcia Jean Kurtz as School Clerk
 Sloane Shelton as Mrs. Phillips (Lorna's mother)

Real-life inspirations
Politico'''s Jeffrey Ressner writes that Arthur and Annie Pope were loosely modeled after Weather Underground leaders Bill Ayers and Bernardine Dohrn. John Simon states that the characters' bombing of a napalm research facility was inspired by the Sterling Hall bombing of 1970.

ReceptionRunning on Empty was released on September 9, 1988, in 22 theaters, where it grossed $215,157 on its opening weekend. It went on to make $2,835,116 in North America.

Film critic Roger Ebert gave the film four out of four stars and called it "one of the best films of the year". In her review for The New York Times, Janet Maslin wrote, "The courtship between Danny and Lorna is staged especially disarmingly, with Mr. Phoenix and Miss Plimpton conveying a sweet, serious and believably gradual attraction." Newsweek'' magazine's David Ansen wrote, "A curious mix of soap opera and social history, Lumet's film shouldn't work, yet its fusion of oddly matched parts proves emotionally overpowering. You have to be pretty tough to resist it."

Rotten Tomatoes gives the film an approval rating of 81% based on reviews from 31 critics. Metacritic gave the film a score of 67 based on 17 reviews, indicating "generally favorable reviews".

The Japanese filmmaker Akira Kurosawa cited this movie as one of his 100 favorite films.

Accolades

See also
 Sara Jane Olson
 James Kilgore
 Silas Bissell
 List of oldest and youngest Academy Award winners and nominees – Youngest nominees for Best Actor in a Supporting Role
 61st Academy Awards
 46th Golden Globe Awards
 60th National Board of Review Awards
 1988 in film

References

External links
 
 
 
 
 
 

1988 films
1980s coming-of-age drama films
1980s English-language films
American coming-of-age drama films
1988 drama films
Films directed by Sidney Lumet
Warner Bros. films
Films shot in New Jersey
Films set in New Jersey
Films shot in New York (state)
Films set in 1987
1980s American films